Sietas is a German surname.

People
Erwin Sietas (1910–1989), German swimmer
Tom Sietas (born 1977), German swimmer

Companies
Pella Sietas GmbH, a shipbuilder based in Hamburg, Germany

German-language surnames